Honsinger Creek is a  stream in San Mateo County, California, and a tributary of Pescadero Creek.

Tributaries
Big Chicken Hollow
Little Chicken Hollow
Windmill Gulch

References

See also
List of watercourses in the San Francisco Bay Area

Rivers of San Mateo County, California
Rivers of Northern California
Tributaries of Pescadero Creek